The 1988 Army Cadets football team was an American football team that represented the United States Military Academy in the 1988 NCAA Division I-A football season. In their sixth season under head coach Jim Young, the Cadets compiled a 9–3 record and outscored their opponents by a combined total of 336 to 226.  In the annual Army–Navy Game, the Cadets defeated Navy, 20–15.  They also lost a close game to Alabama, 29–28, in the 1988 Sun Bowl.

Schedule

Personnel

Season summary

Holy Cross

at Washington

Northwestern

Bucknell

at Yale

Lafayette

vs Rutgers

Air Force
Mike Mayweather rushed for 192 yards and one touchdown while Bryan McWilliams added two scores on the ground.

Vanderbilt

vs Boston College

vs Navy

Army wins the Commander-in-Chief's Trophy

Sun Bowl (vs Alabama)

References

Army
Army Black Knights football seasons
Army Cadets football